Sergei Mikhailovich Sukhov (born 17 November 1965) is a former Russian professional footballer.

Club career
He made his professional debut in the Soviet Second League in 1986 for FC Saturn Andropov.

Honours
 Soviet Cup finalist: 1990.

References

1965 births
Footballers from Moscow
Living people
Soviet footballers
Russian footballers
Association football forwards
Russian Premier League players
FC Lokomotiv Moscow players
FC Akhmat Grozny players
FC Rotor Volgograd players
FC Arsenal Tula players
FC Spartak Moscow players
FC Shinnik Yaroslavl players
FC Dynamo Moscow reserves players